Aluminium monostearate is an organic compound which is a salt of stearic acid and aluminium.  It has the molecular formula Al(OH)2C18H35O2.  It is also referred to as dihydroxy(octadecanoato-O-)aluminium or dihydroxy(stearato)aluminium.

Uses
It is used to form gels in the packaging of pharmaceuticals, and in the preparation of colors for cosmetics.  It is usually safe in commercial products, but aluminium may accumulate in the body.

References

Aluminium compounds
Stearates